The 1990 Minnesota Twins, three years after their World Series title in 1987, fell to the bottom of the AL West once again. However, the season was not completely bad, as there were some bright spots that included pitchers Rick Aguilera and Scott Erickson. Aguilera converted from starter to closer and recorded 32 saves, while Erickson was promoted to the Twins in June from AA and went 8-4 with a 3.27 ERA. During Fan Appreciation Day on October 3, Outfielder Dan Gladden made a prediction saying that even though we finished in last place this season, we're going to improve next season and if we did, they could potentially bring another World Series championship to Minnesota. That prediction proved accurate the next year.

Offseason
December 4, 1989: Drafted Shane Mack from the San Diego Padres in the 1989 Rule 5 draft.
December 6, 1989: Signed Kent Hrbek as a free agent.
January 8, 1990: Carmelo Castillo was signed as a free agent with the Minnesota Twins.

Regular season

The lone representative of the Twins in the All-Star Game was center fielder Kirby Puckett.
The highest paid Twin in 1990 was Puckett at $2,816,667; followed by Kent Hrbek at $2,100,000.

Offense

Pitching

Defense

The highlight of the season came on July 17, in Boston, when the Twins turned two triple plays. In the 4th inning, with the bases loaded and Scott Erickson pitching, former Twin Tom Brunansky hit a sharp grounder to Gary Gaetti at third base, who stepped on the bag for the force out, fired to Al Newman at second, whose relay to Kent Hrbek was in time to get Brunansky at first. In the 8th inning, with John Candelaria pitching and runners on first and second, Jody Reed hit a one-hopper at Gaetti who again started a 5-4-3 triple play. This was the first time in MLB history that two triple plays were recorded in a game, a feat that has not been duplicated since.

The following night, still in Boston, both teams combined for an MLB-record-tying ten double plays.  Boston tied an American League record by grounding into six DPs in the game, only escaping the twin killings in the sixth and seventh innings.

Both games were won by Boston.

Season standings

Record vs. opponents

Roster

Notable Transactions
April 4: Traded Mike Pomeranz (minors) to the Pittsburgh Pirates. Received Junior Ortiz and Orlando Lind (minors).
June 4, 1990: Midre Cummings was drafted by the Minnesota Twins in the 1st round (29th pick) of the 1990 amateur draft. Player signed June 12, 1990.
June 4, 1990: Jayhawk Owens was drafted by the Minnesota Twins in the 2nd round of the 1990 amateur draft. Player signed June 12, 1990.
June 4: Drafted Eddie Guardado in the 21st round of the 1990 amateur draft. Player signed May 23, 1991.
July 27: Traded John Candelaria to the Toronto Blue Jays. Received Nelson Liriano and Pedro Muñoz.
December 18: Randy Bush was signed as a free agent with the Minnesota Twins.

Player stats

Batting

Starters by position
Note: Pos = Position; G = Games played; AB = At bats; H = Hits; Avg. = Batting average; HR = Home runs; RBI = Runs batted in

Other batters
Note: G = Games played; AB = At bats; H = Hits; Avg. = Batting average; HR = Home runs; RBI = Runs batted in

Starting pitchers
Note: G = Games pitched; IP = Innings pitched; W = Wins; L = Losses; ERA = Earned run average; SO = Strikeouts

Other pitchers
Note: G = Games pitched; IP = Innings pitched; W = Wins; L = Losses; ERA = Earned run average; SO = Strikeouts

Relief pitchers
Note: G = Games pitched; W = Wins; L = Losses; SV = Saves; ERA = Earned run average; SO = Strikeouts

Farm system

LEAGUE CHAMPIONS: Elizabethton

Notes and explanations

External links
Player stats from www.baseball-reference.com
Team info from www.baseball-almanac.com
Twins history through the 1990s, from www.mlb.com
1990 Standings

Minnesota Twins seasons
Minnesota Twins
Twins